Giovanni Antonio Sgro (16 February 1931 – 18 March 2019) was an Italian-born Australian politician who served as a Member of the Victorian Legislative Council representing the Labor Party for Melbourne North Province from July 1979 until his retirement in August 1992.

Born in Seminara, Italy, Sgro emigrated to Australia in 1952. He was a painter and decorator. He was founding President of FILEF (Federation of Italian Migrant 
Workers and their Families) in 1972. He served as electorate secretary to Jim Simmonds, MLA, from 1978 to 1979.

In Parliament Sgro delivered his maiden speech in the Italian language. He served as Chairman of Committees and Deputy President of the Legislative Council from 1984 to 1989.

References

1931 births
2019 deaths
Australian Labor Party members of the Parliament of Victoria
Members of the Victorian Legislative Council
Italian emigrants to Australia
Australian politicians of Italian descent
House painters
People from the Province of Reggio Calabria